Mrunal Dusanis (born 20 June 1988) is a Marathi actress. She is known for her lead roles in Marathi television programs.

Early life 
She was born in Nashik, Maharashtra. She did her schooling from Maratha High School and later went to HPT College, Nashik. She completed a degree in Masters in Journalism.

Personal life 
She married Neeraj More in 2016 who is a software engineer by profession. In March 2022, she was blessed with a baby girl.

Career 
She has started her career with Ekta Kapoor's serial Maziya Priyala Preet Kalena. After that, she appeared in Tu Tithe Me on Zee Marathi. In 2015, she appeared in Assa Sasar Surekh Bai serial that aired on Colors Marathi. In 2018, she was seen in Sukhachya Sarini He Mann Baware serial as Anushri.

Filmography

Awards and nominations

References

External links 
 Mrunal Dusanis on IMDb

Living people
Actresses in Marathi television
Actresses in Marathi cinema
People from Nashik
1988 births